Cucurpe is the municipal seat of Cucurpe Municipality in the Mexican state of Sonora.

History

Originally the territory was occupied by the Opatas and the Pimas Altas. In 1647 the Jesuit missionary Marcos del Río founded the first Spanish settlement with the category of mission and gave it the name of "Los Santos Reyes de Cucurpe." In 1859 it was given the title of "Villa" and in 1932 it became a municipality.

This town was once the considered the "Rim of Christendom" and it was from here that Father Eusebio Kino rode out to do his now historic work in the area then known as the Pimería Alta.  He rode out on 14 March 1687, 24 years and one day before his death on 15 March 1711.

Rivers
There are two rivers that have clear waters for most of the year and turbulent currents in the rainy season that lasts from June through August.  The Dolores River and the Saracachi come together to form the Sonora River, which flows into the Abelardo L. Rodríguez Reservoir near Hermosillo.

Climate
Due to the higher elevation the climate is cooler than in the desert to the west.  The annual average temperature is 16.5 °C, with summer temperatures rarely reaching 40° and winter days bringing frost and some snow in the higher elevations. The average annual rainfall is 466.8 millimeters.

Economic activity

Most of the work force is employed in agriculture, which concentrates on growing grasses for cattle fodder.  The cattle industry is modest and suffers from lack of infrastructure.  There is one mine, Santa Gertrudis, which has offered a new source of employment.

San Francisco mine
This former gold-silver-molybdenum mine, located about 3 km SE of Cucurpe, is famous among mineral collectors for producing exceptionally fine specimens of wulfenite.

References

External links

 Cucurpe — @ Sonora Turismo (Spanish)
Santa Gertrudis mine website

Populated places in Sonora
Populated places established in 1647